4th parallel may refer to:

4th parallel north, a circle of latitude in the Northern Hemisphere
4th parallel south, a circle of latitude in the Southern Hemisphere